St. George Regional Airport  is a city-owned airport in St. George, Washington County, Utah.

The airport opened on January 13, 2011, a replacement for smaller land-locked St. George Municipal Airport, atop a mesa in the city, which was declared unsuitable for expansion. It is served by SkyWest Airlines with code sharing flights operated on behalf of American Airlines, Delta Air Lines and United Airlines.  SkyWest, one of the largest regional airlines in the world, is based in St. George.

The former airport used SGU as the location identifier for the Federal Aviation Administration (FAA) and International Air Transport Association (IATA). The new airport was assigned a transitional identifier DXZ by the FAA, but retained the IATA designation SGU. On December 15, 2011, the FAA returned SGU to use at the new airport.

History
The prospect of a new airport for the region had been considered for many years. The old airport had a small terminal with a single gate and a runway that was too small for larger aircraft. It had no room for expansion, as it was situated atop a mesa. With the growth of the area and tourism rapidly increasing, the need for a new airport became more urgent. A site was chosen about 6 miles southeast of downtown at an abandoned airfield which had not seen air traffic since 1961 and most recently had been used for vehicle drag racing and radio controlled aircraft.

An Environmental Impact Statement (EIS) for the present airport was completed in August 2006. The study concluded that the impact on the environment and noise pollution would be minimal. Plans for this new larger airport included a single 10,000 ft (3048m) runway suitable for regional jets and smaller mainline aircraft. The runway was initially planned to be oriented at about 010/190 degrees. A 9,300 ft runway was eventually constructed. 

The new St. George Airport was partially funded by grants from the FAA totaling $123 million. The entire project was expected to cost about 159 million dollars. The city broke ground on the new site in October 2008 and the airport opened on January 13, 2011. SkyWest Airlines (operating as Delta Connection) announced that on January 13, 2011 the airline would begin nonstop daily services to Salt Lake City from the airport, using Canadair CRJ regional jets. SkyWest subsequently initiated nonstop Canadair CRJ regional jet services to Denver operating as United Express.

On July 13, 2015 the airport changed its name from St. George Municipal Airport to St. George Regional Airport in a bid to attract more airline services to the airport.

Late in 2018, Allegiant Air announced flights from St. George to Phoenix-Mesa Gateway Airport from November 9 of that year, which were the first mainline jets to serve St. George, as Allegiant operates Airbus A320 aircraft. However, Allegiant Air later suspended all flights to St. George Regional Airport.

Federal Aviation Administration records say the airport had 80,562 boardings (enplanements) in calendar year 2020 (during COVID-19 pandemic), 102,297 in calendar year 2019 (during which the airport was closed for part of the year), 123,060 in calendar year 2018, 103,569 in 2017, 103,569 in calendar year 2017, 78,680 in calendar year 2016, 69,680 in calendar year 2015, and 59,321 in calendar year 2014.

2019 closure

The airport was closed in May 2019 for reconstruction of its lone runway. Officials found soil issues at the airport only a few years after its opening, and sealed cracks quickly became ubiquitous on the runway and tarmac. The airport was closed through September 2019 as crews excavated as much as 17 feet of earth below the runway. During the closure, the nearest commercial service airports would be Cedar City Regional Airport, 60 miles northeast, or McCarran International Airport near Las Vegas, 129 miles southwest.

Facilities
The airport has a  terminal.

In the 12 months ending August 4, 2020 the airport had 80,105 aircraft operations, average 219 per day: 86% general aviation, 3% air taxi, 8% airline, and 2% military. 195 aircraft were then based at the airport: 150 single-engine, 20 multi-engine, 6 jet, 7 helicopter, 10 gliders and 2 ultralight.

The airport is serviced by two fixed-base operator, Above View Jet Center and Sandstone Aviation.

Airlines and destinations
The old St. George Municipal Airport was served by Bonanza Air Lines, which in the late 1950s, began flying Douglas DC-3s to Salt Lake City via Cedar City and Provo, and to Phoenix via Prescott. By 1962, Bonanza had replaced its DC-3s with larger Fairchild F-27 turboprops; however, this airline had ceased all service to St George, instead serving Cedar City, Utah with the F-27 as this aircraft was deemed too large for the old airfield. SkyWest Airlines then started flying to Salt Lake City on June 19, 1972 via Cedar City.  SkyWest later introduced Fairchild Swearingen Metroliner propjets followed by Embraer EMB-120 Brasilia propjets to the old airport before moving to the new airport.

In November 2016 American Eagle operated by SkyWest Airlines CRJ 200 regional jets began flying between St. George and Phoenix.

Passenger

Statistics

Top destinations

Annual Traffic

Accidents and incidents
On May 26, 2012 at around 1:30 a.m., four people were killed when a Cessna 172 crashed during take-off from St. George Municipal Airport. The airport is not staffed at night and uses an automated system, so the wreckage was not found until more than 4 hours later. A security camera captured the plane taking off.
On July 17, 2012 a SkyWest Airlines Bombardier CRJ200, Delta Connection aircraft, was stolen by SkyWest employee Brian Hedglin, and substantially damaged at the airport. The terminal and a jetway also were damaged. The plane was not put back in service.

Between the St. George Municipal and Regional Airports there have been a total of only 21 accidents or incidents in and around the airport since 1982 (less than one per year for 80K yearly operations).

References

External links

 St. George Municipal Airport, official website
 St. George Replacement Airport Environmental Impact Statement
 Above View Jet Center, fixed base operator.
 Sandstone Aviation, fixed base operator.
 Kings Avionics, avionics maintenance, repair, and installation.
 

Airports in Utah
Buildings and structures in St. George, Utah
Transportation in Washington County, Utah
Airports established in 2011